Edward Joseph "Ebba" St. Claire (August 5, 1921 – August 22, 1982) was an American catcher in Major League Baseball. He was a switch hitter and threw right-handed. He can best be described as a prototypical defensive-minded backup catcher.

He was born in Whitehall, New York, and was a standout catcher on the Whitehall Central High School baseball team. After his high school career ended, St. Claire attended Colgate University, where he was a star player.

As there was no amateur entry baseball draft at the time, St. Claire began his professional career on January 1, 1942, when he was signed as an amateur free agent by the Pittsburgh Pirates.

After a long minor league career, St. Claire was traded by Pittsburgh to the Boston Braves as part of a minor league working agreement so that he could tutor young pitchers in the Braves organization. He made his major league debut with Boston on April 17, 1951. He played with Boston again in 1952 and continued to play with the Braves franchise in 1953 when they relocated and became the Milwaukee Braves. On February 1, 1954, St. Claire was traded by Milwaukee with Johnny Antonelli, Billy Klaus, Don Liddle, and $50,000 to the New York Giants for Bobby Thomson and Sam Calderone.  After spending much of this season in the minor leagues, St. Claire was released from his contract and never played professional baseball again.

Ebba St. Claire died in Whitehall at the age of 61. His son Randy St. Claire played for five Major League clubs between 1984 and 1994, and later became a pitching coach.

External links

1921 births
1982 deaths
Albany Senators players
Atlanta Crackers players
Baseball players from New York (state)
Boston Braves players
Hornell Maples players
Major League Baseball catchers
Milwaukee Braves players
Milwaukee Brewers (minor league) players
Minneapolis Millers (baseball) players
New Orleans Pelicans (baseball) players
New York Giants (NL) players
People from Whitehall, New York
Rochester Red Wings players
Richmond Virginians (minor league) players
San Diego Padres (minor league) players
Sherbrooke Athletics players
Toronto Maple Leafs (International League) players